Walter Owen Bentley,  (16 September 1888 – 13 August 1971) was an English engineer who founded Bentley Motors Limited in London. He was a motorcycle and car racer as a young man. After making a name for himself as a designer of aircraft and automobile engines, Bentley established his own firm in 1919. He built the firm into one of the world's premier luxury and performance auto manufacturers, and led the marque to multiple victories at the 24 Hours of Le Mans. After selling his namesake company to Rolls-Royce Limited in 1931, he was employed as a designer for Lagonda, Aston Martin, and Armstrong Siddeley.

He was known as "W. O." without any need to add the word Bentley.

Early life

Walter Owen Bentley, was born September 16, 1888 in Hampstead, London, he was the youngest of his parents' nine children. His father Alfred Bentley was a retired businessman and his mother Emily (née Waterhouse) was an Adelaide-born woman. As the son of a prosperous family he was privately educated at Clifton College in Bristol from 1902 until 1905, when at the age of 16 he left to start work as an apprentice engineer with the Great Northern Railway at Doncaster in Yorkshire.

Locomotives

The premium five-year apprenticeship with Great Northern, which cost his father £75, taught W.O. to design complex railway machinery and also gave him practical experience in the technical procedures to cast, manufacture, and build it. He later recalled: "The sight of one of Patrick Stirling's eight-foot singles could move me profoundly." While with Great Northern, he came close to realizing his childhood ambition to drive one of their Atlantic express locomotives, when at the end of his apprenticeship he acquired footplate experience as a second fireman on main-line expresses.  "My longest day", he said, "was London to Leeds and back, on the return journey doing Wakefield to King's Cross non-stop for 175 miles. This was a total day's run of 400 miles, entailing a consumption of about seven tons of coal, every pound of it to be shovelled. Not a bad day's exercise." He completed his apprenticeship in the summer of 1910 but decided that the railways did not offer him enough scope for a satisfying career.

Motorcycles
In 1909 and 1910 Bentley raced Quadrant, Rex, and Indian motorcycles. He competed in two Isle of Man Tourist Trophy races, on a Rex in 1909 and as a member of Indian's factory team in 1910. He did not finish in either event; in 1910, his Indian's rear tyre burst on the second lap.

Theoretical engineering study, taxi company employment
After he studied theoretical engineering at King's College London, he took employment with the National Motor Cab Company, where his several duties included overseeing the maintenance of the fleet's 250 Unics. He was fascinated by the cabbies' ingenuity at fiddling the meters.

Entering the automobile industry
In 1912 he joined his brother, H. M. (Horace Millner) Bentley, in a company called "Bentley and Bentley" that sold French DFP cars. Dissatisfied with the performance of the DFPs, yet convinced that success in competition was the best marketing for them, W.O. was inspired by a paperweight to have pistons made for the engine in aluminium alloy. Fitted with the alloy pistons and a modified camshaft, a DFP took several records at Brooklands in 1913 and 1914.

Aero engines

At the outbreak of war Bentley knew that using aluminium alloy pistons in military applications would benefit the national interest: they improved power output and ran cooler, allowing higher compression ratios and higher engine speeds. As security considerations prevented his broadcasting the information to engine manufacturers, he contacted the official liaison between the manufacturers and the Navy. That man, Commander Wilfred Briggs, would be his senior officer throughout the war.

Commissioned in the Royal Naval Air Service, Bentley was sent to share with the manufacturers the knowledge and experience he had gained from the modifications to the engines of the DFP cars he sold in Britain. Following his first consultation, which was with the future Lord Hives at Rolls-Royce, the company's first aero engine, named the Eagle, was designed with pistons of aluminium instead of cast-iron or steel. Bentley next visited Louis Coatalen at Sunbeam, with the result that the same innovation was used in all their aero engines.

Bentley also visited Gwynnes, whose Chiswick factory made French Clerget engines under licence, and he liaised between the squadrons in France and the Chiswick factory's engineering staff. When the Clerget licensees proved unwilling to implement Bentley's more important suggestions the Navy gave him a team to design his own aero engine at the Humber factory in Coventry. Designated the BR1, Bentley Rotary 1, the engine was fundamentally different from the Clerget except in the design of the cam mechanism, which was retained to facilitate production.  A prototype was running in the early summer of 1916. The bigger BR2 followed in early 1918.

In recognition, Bentley was awarded the MBE. After he was invited in 1920 to make a claim, which the Clerget licensees contested unsuccessfully, the Royal Commission on Awards to Inventors awarded him £8,000.

Bentley Motors

After the war, in early 1919, W. O. founded Bentley Motors Limited in small premises in London with Frank Burgess (formerly of Humber) and Harry Varley (formerly of Vauxhall Motors). Clive Gallop joined the team as an engine designer to help develop their  straight-4 engine. The 3-litre engine ran for the first time in New Street Mews, Baker Street, London. A plaque marks the building in what is now Chagford Street NW1. W.O.'s first complete Bentley 3 Litre car began road tests in January 1920 and the first production version, made in Cricklewood, was delivered in September 1921. Its durability earned widespread acclaim.

W.O.'s motto was "To build a good car, a fast car, the best in class." His cars raced in hill climbs and at Brooklands, and the lone 3 Litre entered by the company in the 1922 Indianapolis 500 mile race and driven by Douglas Hawkes finished thirteenth at an average speed of 74.95 mph. Bentley entered a team of his new 3-litre modified and race-prepared cars in the 1922 Tourist Trophy driving himself in Bentley III; the only team to finish they received the Team Award thereby launching Bentley's reputation; Jean Chassagne (later himself a 'Bentley Boy') on a 1921 Grand Prix Sunbeam winning outright. Bentleys set many records at the Le Mans 24-hour races, with "Bentley Boy" Woolf Barnato the only driver to win all three times he entered.

In 1923, when a rather sceptical W.O. was persuaded to attend the inaugural Le Mans race, he saw John Duff and Frank Clement's private entry take fourth place.

A Bentley 3 Litre won at Le Mans in 1924. Neither of the two Bentleys entered in the 1925 race finished it, but subsequent models won again in 1927, 1928, 1929, and 1930, with the factory team managed by W.O.'s old school friend Richard Sidney Witchell. Ettore Bugatti is said to have commented that W.O. made "the fastest lorries in the world".

With Bentley Motors Ltd. in financial difficulties, and the company's board of directors critical of W.O., Kimberley diamond magnate Barney Barnato's heir Woolf Barnato purchased the business's assets and became chairman. 

W. O. continued his design work as Barnato's employee. The racing version of the W.O.-designed six-cylinder Speed Six—the road car was introduced in 1928—proved to be the most successful Bentley in competition, and won Le Mans in 1929 and 1930. In 1929, against W.O.'s wishes, Barnato approved the development of a supercharged, "Blower" version of the 1927 4½ Litre. Tim Birkin's brainchild, the car was made in separate, purpose-built workshops, away from W. O., in Welwyn Garden City. As W.O. had feared, durability proved poor and the car failed on the track.

Although Barnato continued racing Bentleys with distinction, and even though the company sold a hundred of its 8 Litre model, which was launched as a grand car for the ultra-rich in October 1930 (Bugatti sold three of his equivalent model, the Royale), the Great Depression took its toll.

By July 1931 Barnato's financial support had dwindled, and Bentley Motors went into voluntary liquidation. On 10 July a Receiver was appointed to the company. W. O.'s cars had accumulated losses of £136,220 and had worked through three fortunes including Barnato's.

D. Napier and Son entered negotiations as prospective purchasers. 

Cricklewood production

 506 of the 3-litre cars were 'Speed Models' and 15 '100 mph Models'
 54 of the -litre cars were supercharged
 171 of the short-chassis -litre cars were 'Speed Sixes'

Rolls-Royce Limited, Derby

However it was arch rival Rolls-Royce who bought the company, topping Napier's bid at the last minute and announcing the acquisition on 20 November 1931. Rolls-Royce had been disturbed by the 8 Litre's encroachment upon the market segment of their Phantom II. Rolls-Royce's agents had posed as the British Equitable central trust to avoid alerting Napier and inflating the price. The old business had not troubled to register their Bentley trademark. Rolls-Royce took immediate steps to remedy that. Cricklewood was closed during 1932. Thereafter production was from Rolls-Royce premises in Derby and, postwar, Crewe.

Rolls-Royce had acquired the Bentley showrooms in Cork Street, the service station at Kingsbury, the whole establishment at Cricklewood and Bentley himself. This last was disputed by Napier in court without success. Everything was sold but some 8-litre chassis which were taken to Derby. The name alone was to be kept and used for a smaller economy car but that prototype proved to be as complex and expensive as the bigger Rolls-Royces and its development was halted.

W. O. believed Barnato had bought a substantial shareholding in Rolls-Royce just before pulling out his support while visiting New York. Barnato was invited to become a director of the new Rolls-Royce subsidiary, Bentley Motors (1931) Limited.

W. O.'s winter of 1931/1932 was hard, his wife divorced him and he lost any form of personal transport, when he was asked to return his personal Bentley 8 Litre. Hearing of this W. E. Rootes arranged for him to test a new Hillman each weekend.

Lock-out
As obliged to do by the court he joined Rolls-Royce under a contract extending from 1 May 1932 to the end of April 1935. Rolls-Royce isolated him in London and Europe, keeping him occupied as liaison between customers and—at long range—the works, to test drive vehicles at Brooklands and for long test runs across the Continent and the Alps.

While he worked on testing the prototype he was only permitted to comment on the design of what would become the new Derby -litre announced in October 1933. Around that time he managed to begin to report in person to the design teams at Derby making friends in the process. Among them Harry Grylls and Stewart Tresilian who did some design-only work on a short-stroke replacement for the V12 engine for their Phantom III. W. O. had been effectively sequestered from the design team of the new car bearing his own name. But, he did admire their achievement.

Rolls-Royce promoted its new line of Bentleys as "The Silent Sports Car". W. O. left Rolls-Royce at the end of April 1935 with a sense of freedom.

Lagonda, Staines, Middlesex

A Lagonda M45R Rapide with a Meadows engine won the 1935 Le Mans 24-hour race, and a week later Lagonda was saved from receivership by Alan P Good. W. O. joined the new board as Technical Director and moved to Lagonda with the majority of Rolls-Royce's racing department staff. W. O. again went racing. Unable to persuade Harry Grylls to join his engineering staff at Staines, W. O. obtained Stewart Tresilian's services from February 1936. Tresilian brought Frank Stark and Reg Ingham with him., and Donald Bastow joined them.

W. O. made Tresilian chief designer of the V12 project, and the engine was launched in 1937. Displacing 4480 cc, it delivered 180 bhp (134 kW) and was said to be capable of going from 7 to 105 mph in top gear and revving to 5000 rpm. Tresilian left in early 1938 for a Hawker Siddeley subsidiary. Development of the V12 was not complete but Lagonda's financial difficulties prompted more staff to leave.

The car was exhibited at the 1939 New York Motor Show. The New York Times commented: "The highest price car in the show this year is tagged $8,900. It is a Lagonda, known as the "Rapide" model, imported from England. The power plant is a twelve-cylinder V engine developing 200 horsepower."

During the war W. O. worked on armaments at Lagonda. Towards the end of the war he began work on a new straight-6 engine, as it was clear that the V12 would be seen as too extravagant for the postwar market. The team developed a modern dual overhead cam straight-6 engine with an initial displacement of 2.6 L (2580 cc/157 in3). With a 78 mm (3.07 in) bore and 90 mm (3.543 in) stroke, it produced about 105 hp (78 kW) with dual SU carburettors. It would not reach the market until 1948.

Due to a shortage of materials, the Ministry of Supply, whose wartime controls over the allocation of steel would remain in force from 1945 to 1954, had allocated Lagonda the steel for only 100 cars. Although the Ministry's controls were intended to maintain supply to existing manufacturers, they were applied unevenly—while Lagonda had tooled up for quantity production and provided evidence of a substantial export order book, David Brown's companies were able to obtain the steel they required. One consequence of the controls was that aluminium was used in the construction of Land-Rovers, winning them an unintended reputation for not rusting.

In August, 1947, J. R. Greenwood, Chairman of Lagonda, announced that although work had begun on the first 1,000 of the new Bentley-designed -litre cars, the project had been cancelled owing to continuing production difficulties and the recently imposed double purchase tax. While Lagonda would continue with its other engineering activities, including the manufacture of a diesel-powered pile-driver, the company notified its 1,600 workers that some of them would inevitably become redundant.

David Brown, Feltham, Middlesex
A month later, in mid-September it was announced that the Lagonda specification had been bought by David Brown & Sons (Huddersfield) Limited, gear-wheel manufacturer, which would combine production with Aston Martin bought earlier that year.

Production was moved to Feltham, Middlesex.

Brown had purchased Lagonda largely to gain Bentley's engineering expertise, and immediately placed W. O. 's newest creation, his 2.6-litre Lagonda Straight-6 engine, under the bonnet of Brown's other new acquisition, the Frank Feeley-designed DB2. This durable DOHC engine would continue in Lagondas and Aston Martins until 1959 and, W. O. noted, important design details were carried on through to their V8.

Armstrong Siddeley
W. O. moved from Aston Martin-Lagonda to Armstrong Siddeley, where he designed another twin-overhead-cam 3-litre engine before retiring. His team included Donald Bastow. According to one report the team's responsibility for the Sapphire project extended to the car's chassis, but by the time their work ended in 1949 they had contributed little more than detailed inspiration for the production version of the car that was announced in October 1952. Although W. O.'s particular engine design was judged too costly for production, it was because of his involvement that the final Sapphire product received the respect of contemporary designers.

Personal life
W. O. married three times. In 1914 he married Leonie Gore, daughter of Sir St George Ralph Gore, ninth baronet of Magherabegg . She died in 1919, in the Spanish flu epidemic. In 1920 W. O.  married Poppy (Audrey Hutchinson) (1895-1981), a fun-loving society woman who disliked factories, whereas Bentley was said to love spending time in the workshop. They divorced soon after the business was sold in 1931.  In 1934 he married Margaret Roberts Hutton, née Murray, who survived him. He had no children.

At the time of his death on Friday 13 August 1971, shortly before his 83rd birthday, in Woking, Surrey, W. O. was the patron of The Bentley Drivers' Club. Margaret died in 1989.

W. O. Bentley was inducted into the Automotive Hall of Fame in 1995.

Obituaries
Following his lengthy obituary printed in The Times 16 August 1971 the same newspaper printed two more contributions.

" . . . In the eyes of those who own, have owned, or aspire to own, one of the 3,040 Bentley cars designed and built by the 'old' Bentley company under the leadership of "W. O." he was admired and respected—indeed, I think, loved is not too strong a word—for to know his cars was to know him. During his working life "W. O." suffered a series of ups and downs which might have broken a lesser man. It certainly marked him and it was a disillusioned "W. O." I first met 25 years ago [1946]. . . . "W. O." has said that the pleasure he derived in the post-war years from Club activities; from making new friends among its members; and from seeing the loving care bestowed upon 'his' cars has more than compensated for all his earlier disappointments." S. S.

"The six years during which I worked for "W. O." were a period of education and pleasure. His modesty, lack of pretension, mental honesty and reasonableness endeared him to those in contact with him, and his over-riding interest in the improvement of the car provided the education in a period which included the post-war -litre Lagonda development, schemes for 4 and 8 cylinder derivatives, for the pursuit of shorter strokes in engines, for a small transverse-engined front wheel drive car and for a performance engine for the Morris Minor in place of the 850cc side valve engine it then endured.

Though normally of reflective habit his experience showed him when swift action was necessary, and he could be very determined in pursuing it. Big enough to admit mistakes when they had occurred, he also knew when to modify and when to start afresh in remedying them.

It is a pity that circumstances prevented his influence on car development from being greater than it was. Though motoring and motor cars were his life he retained a keen interest in locomotives." Mr Donald Bastow.

The Bentley Drivers' Club
Woolf Barnato (1895–1948) served a term as president. W. O. agreed to become patron in 1947. Founded in 1936 the club now has nearly 4,000 members throughout the United Kingdom, Europe, US, Canada, Southern Africa, Australia, New Zealand and Japan.

Notes

References

Bibliography

External links
The W. O. Bentley Memorial Foundation
 The Bentley Drivers' Club
 Pictures and specifications of W. O. 's cars 1919–1932
 Bentley 8-litre coupé, coachwork by J Gurney Nutting
 Channel 4 short biography of Bentley
 
 Jay Leno explains and demonstrates W. O.'s racing Lagonda V12
 Jay Leno shows his 8-litre Bentley saloon

1888 births
1971 deaths
People educated at Clifton College
Alumni of the University of London
Alumni of King's College London
British automotive pioneers
Bentley
British automobile designers
British founders of automobile manufacturers
Isle of Man TT riders
Members of the Order of the British Empire
People from Hampstead
Royal Navy officers of World War I
Automotive businesspeople
British engineers
English people of Australian descent
British people of Australian descent